Richard Irvine Best (17 January 1872 – 25 September 1959), often known as R. I. Best, was an Irish scholar who specialised in Celtic Studies.

Best was born into a Protestant family in Derry and educated at Foyle College before working for a time in a bank. As a young man he went to Paris to study Old Irish, where he met Kuno Meyer and attended Henri d'Arbois de Jubainville's lectures at the Collège de France. On his return to Ireland he translated the latter's Le Cycle Mythologique Irlandais et la Mythologie Celtique into English and became Assistant Director at the National Library of Ireland in 1904.

He married Edith Oldman, a musician, in 1906 and the couple were active in the administration of the Feis Ceoil. Edith was six years Best's senior and the sister of Professor C. H. Oldman of University College Dublin. The couple had no children.

From 1913 onwards he published his multi-volume Bibliography of Irish Philology and Manuscript Literature: Publications (1913–1941). Best was director of the National Library from 1929 to 1940. He was Senior Professor of Celtic Studies at the Dublin Institute for Advanced Studies from its establishment in 1940. He was elected president of the Royal Irish Academy from 1943 to 1946. He served as chairman of the Irish Manuscripts Commission from 1948 to 1956 and was an honorary fellow of the Bibliographical Society of Ireland. Best was awarded honorary doctorates by the National University of Ireland and Trinity College Dublin and the Leibniz Medal of the Royal Prussian Academy.

He died at his home, 57 Upper Leeson Street, on 25 September 1959.

Best was an acquaintance of J. M. Synge and James Joyce. Joyce depicted Best in Ulysses as one of the characters in the National Library scene in Episode 9 Scylla and Charybdis. Best was known to have disapproved of Joyce's characterisation of him. According to Frank O'Connor, Best boasted that he was the only person in Dublin from whom Joyce never succeeded in borrowing money. Flann O'Brien affectionately satirised him alongside his fellow scholars D. A. Binchy and Osborn Bergin in his poem Binchy and Bergin and Best. He was a close friend of George Moore, and according to a well-known story, he had to explain to Moore that "it were better" is not bad English but the subjunctive mood; Moore apparently had never heard of it, but vowed that he would never again use any mood but the subjunctive.

The R. I. Best Memorial Lectures were established by the National Library in his honour.

Selected publications
The Irish Mythological Cycle and Celtic Mythology translated, (1903)
Bibliography of Irish Philology and of Printed Irish Literature (1913)
Bibliography of Irish Philology and Manuscript Literature, Publications, 2 vols, (1913–1941) [2 vols.]
The Martyrology of Tallaght, editor, (1931)
The Book of Leinster, formerly Lebar na Nuachongbála, co-edited, (1954–67)

External links
Binchy and Bergin and Best by Flann O'Brien

References

1872 births
1959 deaths
Writers from Derry (city)
Linguists from Ireland
Celtic studies scholars
People educated at Foyle College
Presidents of the Royal Irish Academy
Academics of the Dublin Institute for Advanced Studies